David Ellis (born Derrick Francis Kerkham; 22 June 1918 – 30 June 1978) was the co-writer with Malcolm Hulke of the Doctor Who serial The Faceless Ones, recorded with Patrick Troughton in 1967. The story was penned by the duo following the rejection of previous scripts by the two men. Indeed, Ellis himself had seen his script ideas for “The Clock”, “The People Who Couldn't Remember” and “The Ocean Liner” all rejected. Their script “The Big Store” was also finally not commissioned despite extensive work, though some of the ideas about the substitution of people by replicas was taken further in The Faceless Ones, with the scenario changed from a department store to an airport.

David Ellis's other writing credits include Paul Temple, Spy Trap, and many episodes of Dixon of Dock Green in the 1960s and Z-Cars in the late 1960s and early 1970s. Ellis wrote detective plays for the Midweek Theatre slot on BBC Radio 4. His radio serial in seven parts Find the Lady, first broadcast on BBC Radio 2 in January 1969, was rebroadcast on Radio 4 Extra in January 2020. Noel Johnson took the lead part. He also wrote stage plays. Make Me A Widow was the most successful of these, opening in London in the Summer of 1964 and playing in repertory around the country for many years afterwards.

Ellis was married twice and his second wife, Dorothy, lived into her nineties.

Proposed Doctor Who stories 
Doctor Who: The Clock

Ellis had written this story since March 1966. Not much was known about it. A minor plot of the story was to be a four-part story that would see the Doctor, Polly, and Ben encounter a disastrous result from ‘the clock’ of his TARDIS (theories/references to The Daleks' Master Plan).

The story was rejected by story editor Gerry Davis on 4 April 1966 because he considered the plot too complicated. Davis also rejected Ellis’s four-part serial: ’The Ocean Liner’.

The People Who Couldn’t Remember

Co-written with Malcolm Hulke, this was to be a six-part story. Not much is known about this story. This was rejected by story editor Gerry Davis on 15 June 1966 because Davis wanted to avoid submitting ‘Who-historical’ comedies for one primary example, ‘The Gunfighters’ with its poor production reception.

The Ocean Liner

This four-part, spy thriller story was submitted in December 1965. Not much is known about it. The story was rejected by Gerry Davis on 4 April 1966 for the same reason as for “The Clock”.

The Big StoreEllis, who once again co-wrote with Hulke in November 1966, submitted this four-part story, with complete drafts for Episode One.

The story would see The Doctor, Polly, Jamie, and Ben land in a mall in 1973, where they discover a two, unidentified aliens; one by numbers and another with letters. The unidentified aliens plan on wiping out the human race with a plague too strong to handle.  Mannequins as robots break through glass shop windows.

Script editor Gerry Davis liked the story concept, but wanted a proper setting at an airport station, so they changed the story to The Faceless Ones. The mannequin invasion story idea was reused in Robert Holmes’ Spearhead from Space in 1970 as a Jon Pertwee serial.

References

External links

1918 births
1978 deaths
English television writers
Writers from Salford
20th-century English screenwriters